Herrljunga Municipality (Herrljunga kommun) is a municipality in Västra Götaland County in western Sweden. Its seat is located in the town of Herrljunga.

The local government reform of 1952 formed two municipalities, Herrljunga and Gäsene, in the area. Before that the number was 22. In 1974 they were merged to form the present entity.

Localities
55% of the population live in built-up areas. The largest of them are:
Annelund
Fåglavik
Herrljunga
Hudene
Ljung

Politics

Since the 2022 election the municipal government is controlled by a majority consisting of the Social Democrats, Left Party, Centre Party and Liberals with Mats Palm of the Social Democrats as commissioner. The municipal council of Herrljunga has 34 seats.

References

External links

Herrljunga Municipality - Official site
Herrljunga Cider - In Swedish, English and German
Herrljunga Cider UK Distributor - In English

Municipalities of Västra Götaland County
North Älvsborg